Don't Worry is a track from Modern Talking's fifth album Romantic Warriors, which was released in 1987 for Spain's market only where it peaked at #25.

Track listing
7" Single Hansa 109 436 year 1987
Don't Worry
Blinded By Your Love

12" Single Hansa 609 436 year 1987
Don't Worry
Romantic Warriors
Blinded By Your Love

Don't Worry 2001

Don't Worry 2001 is a bootleg single released in 2001, remixed by Polish DJ RavL.

Track listing
CD Single SRS
"Don't Worry 2001" (Edgar III Disco Edit) (Dieter Bohlen) - 3:22
"Don't Worry 2001" (Edgar III Disco Remix) (Dieter Bohlen) - 6:34
"Don't Worry 2001" (Sea Side vs. DJ Ravl Club Mix) (Dieter Bohlen) - 5:36
"Don't Worry" (Original Extended Version) (Dieter Bohlen) - 5:37

References

External links

1987 singles
2001 singles
Modern Talking songs
Songs written by Dieter Bohlen
Song recordings produced by Dieter Bohlen
Hansa Records singles
1986 songs